A margarita is a cocktail consisting of Tequila, triple sec, and lime juice. Some margarita recipes include simple syrup as well and are often served with salt on the rim of the glass. Margaritas can either be served shaken with ice (on the rocks), without ice (straight up), or blended with ice (frozen margarita). Most bars serve margaritas in a stepped-diameter variant of a cocktail glass or champagne coupe called a margarita glass. The margarita is one of the world's most popular cocktails and the most popular Tequila based cocktail.

Origin
The history of the margarita is shrouded in mystery and folklore due to its numerous origin stories. According to cocktail historian David Wondrich, the margarita is related to the brandy daisy (margarita is Spanish for "daisy"), remade with tequila instead of brandy. (Daisies are a family of cocktails that include a base spirit, liqueur, and citrus. A sidecar and gin daisy are other related drinks.) There is an account from 1936 of Iowa newspaper editor James Graham finding such a cocktail in Tijuana, years before any of the other margarita "creation myths".

The Cafe Royal Cocktail Book, published in the UK in 1937, contains a recipe for a Picador using the same concentrations of tequila, triple sec, and lime juice as a margarita. One of the earliest stories is of the margarita being invented in 1938 by Carlos "Danny" Herrera at his restaurant Rancho La Gloria, halfway between Tijuana and Rosarito, Baja California, created for customer and former Ziegfeld dancer Marjorie King, who was allergic to many spirits, but not to tequila. This story was related by Herrera and also by bartender Albert Hernandez, acknowledged for popularizing a margarita in San Diego after 1947, at the La Plaza restaurant in La Jolla. The story was debunked in 1992 by the San Diego Reader.

According to Jose Cuervo, the cocktail was invented in 1938 by a bartender in honor of Mexican showgirl Rita de la Rosa.

Hussong's Cantina also claims to have been the site of the margarita's creation in Ensenada, Baja California, in 1941. Bartender Don Carlos Orozco reputedly named a new drink after Mexican-German patron Margarita Henkel Cesena, a frequent customer to the cantina. Cesena was a ranch operator by trade, and it is disputed whether she was the daughter of a German ambassador as the story claims. Hussong's, however, has enjoyed widespread popularity as the home of the original margarita.

There are also claims that the margarita was first mixed in Juárez, Chihuahua at Tommy's Place Bar on July 4, 1942, by Francisco "Pancho" Morales. Morales later left bartending in Mexico to become a US citizen, where he worked as a milkman for 25 years. Mexico's official news agency Notimex and many experts have said Morales has the strongest claim to having invented the margarita.

Others say the inventor was Dallas socialite Margarita Sames when she concocted the drink for her guests at her Acapulco, Guerrero vacation home in 1948. Tommy Hilton reportedly attended, bringing the drink back to the Hilton chain of hotels. However, Jose Cuervo was already running ad campaigns for the margarita three years earlier, in 1945, with the slogan, "Margarita: It's more than a girl's name."

Another common origin tale begins the cocktail's history at the legendary Balinese Room in Galveston, Texas, where, in 1948, head bartender Santos Cruz created the margarita for singer Peggy (Margaret) Lee. He supposedly named it after the Spanish version of her name, Margarita.

The first known publication of a margarita recipe was in the December 1953 issue of Esquire, with a recipe calling for an ounce of Sierra tequila, a dash of triple sec, and the juice of half a lime or lemon. A recipe for a tequila-based cocktail first appeared in the 1930 book My New Cocktail Book by G. F. Steele. Without noting a specific recipe or inventor, a drink called the Tequila Daisy was mentioned in the Syracuse Herald as early as 1936. Margarita is Spanish for Daisy, which is a nickname for Margaret.

A later, certainly false, story is that the margarita was invented in October 1961, at a party in Houston, Texas, by partygoer Robert James "Rusty" Thomson while acting as bartender. He concocted a mixture of equal parts tequila, Controy orange liqueur, lime, and crushed ice in a salt-rimmed glass.

Variations

The IBA (IBA Official list of Cocktails) standard is 10:4:3, that is, tequila:triple sec:fresh lime juice.

The "Original Margarita" recipe, as given by Cointreau on their website, has slightly more of their own sweet liqueur: 1 part white tequila,  part Cointreau, and  part fresh squeezed lime juice.

Flavored tequila
Apple-cinnamon tequila, triple sec, cranberry juice, fresh lime juice, and an apple wedge or lemon twist for garnish combine to form the Cranberry Margarita With Apple-Cinnamon Tequila, a fall seasonal drink.

Flavored liqueurs
Besides Cointreau, other orange-flavored liqueurs that might be used include Grand Marnier (yielding the "Cadillac Margarita"), Gran Gala, other brands of triple sec, or blue curaçao (yielding the blue margarita). When sweeter fruit juices or freshly puréed fruits are added to the margarita, the orange-flavored liqueur is often reduced or omitted. In addition to orange-flavored liqueurs, secondary liqueurs may occasionally be added to a cocktail, including melon-flavored or black raspberry-flavored. Other flavors include pineapple and watermelon.

Fresh lime juice
Freshly squeezed lime juice is the key ingredient. The most common lime in the United States is the thick-skinned Persian lime. However, margaritas in Mexico are generally made with Mexican limes (Key limes). These are small, thin-skinned limes with a more tart and often bitter flavor than Persian limes.

Frozen margarita
The frozen margarita is a margarita served as an ice slush, similar to other tropical-inspired frozen mixed drinks like the hurricane or piña colada. The ingredients can be processed with ice in a kitchen blender, or for larger output, a slush or soft-serve ice cream machine is used: a cooled, horizontal cylinder has a rotating impeller that churns the mix so it will not freeze solid, and the thick half-frozen slush is dispensed from a spout. Frozen margaritas were first served in La Jolla, when Albert Hernandez Sr. stopped using crushed ice and instead combined the ingredients in a blender in 1947. The dedicated frozen margarita machine was introduced by Mariano Martinez in Dallas in 1971.

A lemonade or limeade margarita can be quickly whipped up by using frozen lemonade or limeade concentrate in place of lime juice.

Fruit sodas and sports drinks
Fruity sodas such as fruit punch, lime, pineapple, or mandarin orange Jarritos, or sports drinks such as blue or orange Gatorade, can substitute for triple sec. A margarita made with orange soda and beer is a sunrise beer margarita; if it is made with carbonated fruit punch soda, it is a sunset margarita. The variant that uses grapefruit soda is called a Paloma.

Other fruits and vegetables
Alternate fruits and juice mixtures can also be used in a margarita. Fruits like mango, peach, strawberry, banana, melon, raspberry, or avocado are suitable for creating this drink. Orange juice and pomegranate juice (poured down the inner side of the glass) can make a sunset margarita (so named because the orange is at the top and the red at the bottom). Many recipes call for a splash of orange juice. These days, margaritas can be prepared in many different ways. When the word "margarita" is used by itself, it typically refers to the lime or lemon juice margarita. Still, when other juices are used, the fruits are typically added as adjectives in the name, with lime juice or lemon juice added to give it a characteristic margarita flavor (a wedge of lime is often added to the glass). Other varieties of margarita include fruit margarita, top-shelf margarita, and virgin margarita.

Coconut cream, coconut milk, and coconut water can also be added to margaritas, e.g., skinny margaritas that substitute, e.g., pineapple juice for liqueurs.

Margaritas can also be made with vegetables such as carrots, beets, cucumber, and celery.

Beer cocktails
A beermarita (or Coronarita) is a beer cocktail that has a bottle of Corona beer or other light-flavored beer poured upside down into a margarita on the rocks.

Skinny
A skinny margarita may be purportedly lower in calories (possibly using artificial sweeteners) or one that uses fresh juices rather than a prepared mix.

One recipe uses fresh lime juice, orange juice, and agave nectar.

Another recipe uses only tequila and some concentrated lime juice.

Related drinks
A margarita with vodka substituted for tequila is a kamikaze.

Glass

Margaritas may be served in a variety of glasses, most notably the margarita glass, a variant of the classic champagne coupe; this is particularly associated with blended fruit margaritas, and the glass is also used for dishes such as guacamole or shrimp cocktails. Margaritas are often served in a standard cocktail glass in formal settings. In contrast, in informal settings, particularly with ice, margaritas may be served in an old fashioned glass, cocktail glass, wine glass, pint glass, and even large schooners.

Popularity
The margarita cocktail was the December 1953 "Drink of the Month" in Esquire magazine, with this recipe:

1 ounce tequila
Dash of triple sec
Juice of  lime or lemon

Pour over crushed ice, stir. Rub the rim of a stem glass with rind of lemon or lime, spin in salt—pour, and sip.

It was further popularized by the 1977 song "Margaritaville" by Jimmy Buffett. In 2004 it was described as "the most popular mixed drink in America". It was used in the title of the 1983 single "Margarita Time" by the English rock band Status Quo and was the inspiration for the cover artwork.

The margarita may be popular because it includes salt, sweet, and sour flavors.

See also
 List of cocktails
 Mexican martini
 Paloma
 Tommy's margarita

References

External links

 

Cocktails with tequila
Cocktails with triple sec or curaçao
Frozen drinks
Mexican alcoholic drinks
Sour cocktails
Citrus cocktails
Three-ingredient cocktails
Cocktails served with a salty rim